Harold Boddington (active 1903–05) was an English footballer who played in the Football League as an outside left for Middlesbrough in 1903–04. He also played non-league football for Darlington.

Boddington made his only League appearance for Middlesbrough on 28 March 1904 in a 3–0 defeat away to Sheffield United in the First Division. He played and scored for Darlington of the Northern League in the 1904–05 FA Cup.

References

Year of birth missing
Year of death missing
Footballers from Darlington
Association football outside forwards
Middlesbrough F.C. players
Darlington F.C. players
English Football League players
Northern Football League players
Place of death missing
English footballers